Frank Joseph Floyd (who fought under name Jack Egan) (May 27, 1878  –  March 15, 1950) was an American lightweight and welterweight boxer who competed in the early twentieth century.

Biography
He was born in Philadelphia, Pennsylvania on May 27, 1878.

Egan won two medals in boxing at the 1904 Summer Olympics, a silver medal in the lightweight category losing to Harry Spanjer in the final and a tied bronze medal in the welterweight category against fellow American boxer, Joseph Lydon. By the rules of the AAU it was illegal to fight under an assumed name. In November 1905 the AAU disqualified Egan from all AAU competitions and he had to return all his prizes including his two Olympics medals.

He died on March 15, 1950.

References

External links
Roster of US Boxing Team in 1904 
Jack Egan's profile at Sports Reference.com

1878 births
1950 deaths
Boxers from Philadelphia
Lightweight boxers
Welterweight boxers
Olympic boxers of the United States
Boxers at the 1904 Summer Olympics
American male boxers
Competitors stripped of Summer Olympics medals